George (Giorgi) (ca. 1570 – 12 March 1605), of the Bagrationi Dynasty, was a crown prince (batonishvili) of Kakheti, a kingdom in eastern Georgia.

George was a son of Alexander II, king of Kakheti (1574–1605), who was temporarily dispossessed of the crown by his oldest son David I in 1601. George revolted against David, who managed to pacify his defiant brother through awarding him a large estate. Nevertheless, George conspired with some of the oppositionist nobles, in 1602, to murder David, but the plot collapsed and the prince fled to the neighboring Georgian ruler, George X of Kartli, who, however, surrendered him to David. George was cast in prison and released when his father, Alexander II, was able to resume his reign upon David's death. He functioned as a regent during his father’s absence at the Safavid Iranian court from early 1604 to March 1605. In August 1604, he received Russian ambassadors and in October employed their armed entourage of 40 musketeers in defeating the expedition of the governors of Ganja and Shemakha against the frontier town of Zagem. On January 1, 1605, George pledged his allegiance to the Tsar of Russia. He was murdered, together with Alexander II, by his Islamized brother Constantin Khan on 12 March 1605. He was survived by two sons, Iese (died 1625) and Konstantine (fl. 1593), and a daughter, Elene, who was married to Prince Parsadan Tsitsishvili (fl. 1609–1640).

Ancestry

References

1570s births
1605 deaths
Bagrationi dynasty of the Kingdom of Kakheti
Georgian princes
16th-century people from Georgia (country)
17th-century people from Georgia (country)
Heirs apparent who never acceded